The Carme group is a group of retrograde irregular satellites of Jupiter that follow similar orbits to Carme and are thought to have a common origin.

Their semi-major axes (distances from Jupiter) range between 22.9 and 24.1 Gm, their orbital inclinations between 164.9° and 165.5°, and their orbital eccentricities between 0.23 and 0.27 (with one exception).

The core members include (negative period indicates retrograde orbit):

The International Astronomical Union (IAU) reserves names ending in -e for all retrograde moons.

Origin
The very low dispersion of the mean1 orbital elements among the core members (the group is separated by less than 700,000 km in semi major axis and less than 0.7° in inclination) suggests that the Carme group may once have been a single body that was broken apart by an impact. The dispersion can be explained by a very small velocity impulse (5 < δV < 50 m/s). 
The parent body was probably about the size of Carme, 46 km in diameter; 99% of the group's mass is still located in Carme.

Further support to the single body origin comes from the known colours: all2 the satellites appear light red, with colour indices B-V= 0.76 and V-R= 0.47
and infrared spectra, similar to D-type asteroids.
These data are consistent with a progenitor from the Hilda family or a Jupiter Trojan.

1Osculating orbital parameters of irregular satellites of Jupiter change widely in short intervals due to heavy perturbation by the Sun. For example, changes of as much as 1 Gm in semi-major axis in 2 years,  0.5 in eccentricity in 12 years, and as much as 5° in 24 years have been reported. 
Mean orbital elements are the averages calculated by the numerical integration of current elements over a long period of time, used to determine the dynamical families.
2With the exception of Kalyke, substantially redder.

References

 
Moons of Jupiter
Irregular satellites
Moons with a retrograde orbit